Norbert Trawöger is an Austrian flautist, teacher, writer and designing musician as well as artistic director of the Bruckner Orchestra Linz.

Life and career
Trawöger was born in Wels, the son of the musician Helmut Trawöger. He trained as a flutist in Vienna, Graz, Gothenburg and Amsterdam.

Since 2013 he has been director of the Kepler Salon in Linz.

Trawöger was personal advisor to the chief conductor Markus Poschner from autumn 2017 and was in charge of the dramaturgy and communication of the Bruckner Orchestra. Since March 2019 he has been artistic director of the Bruckner Orchestra Linz.

Honours
 Elfriede Grünberg Award for the concert series verboten, verfolgt (2008).

Publications
 Balduin Sulzer, Trauner, Linz 2010, .

References

External links
 
 Norbert Trawöger on the website of the Bruckner Orchestra Linz
 Webpräsenz von Norbert Trawöger
 Norbert Trawöger bei basis–wien
 
 

1971 births
20th-century Austrian male musicians
20th-century Austrian musicians
living people
people from Wels